"Curtain in the Window" is a song written by L. Ross, sung by Ray Price, and released on the Columbia label. In March 1958, it peaked at No. 3 on Billboards country and western jockey chart. It spent 18 weeks on the charts and was also ranked No. 27 on Billboards 1958 year-end country and western chart.

See also
 Billboard year-end top 50 country & western singles of 1958

References

Ray Price (musician) songs
1958 songs